Tilphussa is a spring in ancient Boeotia. Tiresias died after he drank water from this spring. Strabo locates the deadly spring below the slopes of Mount Tilphossium, near Haliartus and Alalcomenae; he mentions the sanctuary of Tiresias and the temple of Telphousian Apollo, unique to this site. Pausanias noted that a temple consecrated to Praxidike was in the vicinity of Tiresias's tomb. The manuscript tradition of Plutarch's Life of Lysander offers a unique report of a spring Kiffousa at Haliartus, in which the infant Dionysus was washed; this must be a scribal error for Tilfousa.

Notes

Locations in Greek mythology
Geography of ancient Boeotia
Springs of Greece